Phileurus valgus is a species of rhinoceros beetle in the family Scarabaeidae.

References

Further reading

External links

 

Dynastinae
Articles created by Qbugbot
Beetles described in 1789